The United States District Court for the Southern District of California (in case citations, S.D. Cal.) is a federal court in the Ninth Circuit (except for patent claims and claims against the U.S. government under the Tucker Act, which are appealed to the Federal Circuit).

The District was created on September 28, 1850, following the passage of the California Statehood Act on September 9, 1850. The state was divided into a Northern and Southern district. The Judicial Circuits Act of 1866 abolished the Northern and Southern districts, re-organizing California as a single circuit district. On August 5, 1886 the Southern district was re-established, following the division of the state into Northern and Southern districts. The district was further divided on March 18, 1966 with the creation of the Central and Eastern districts.

The United States Attorney's Office for the Southern District of California represents the United States in civil and criminal litigation in the court.  the United States Attorney is Randy Grossman.

Organization of the court 

The United States District Court for the Southern District of California is one of four federal district courts in California. Court for the District is held at El Centro and the Edward J. Schwartz U.S. Courthouse and U.S. Courthouse Annex in San Diego. The district comprises Imperial and San Diego counties.

Current judges 
:

Vacancies and pending nominations

Former judges

Chief judges

Succession of seats

See also 
 Courts of California
 List of current United States district judges
 List of United States federal courthouses in California

References

External links 
 United States District Court for the Southern District of California
 United States Attorney for the Southern District of California

California, Southern District
California law
Government of Imperial County, California
Government of San Diego County, California
1850 establishments in California
1866 disestablishments in California
1886 establishments in California
Courts and tribunals established in 1850
Courts and tribunals disestablished in 1866
Courts and tribunals established in 1886